Aviation photography is the act of taking images of aircraft, either in flight, or on the ground. Types of aviation photography include air-to-air, ground-to-air, ground-static, and remote photography. Military aviation photography, especially air-to-air, requires additional skills, as the photo and target aircraft often fly at velocities of over Mach 1, while under moderate to high G.

Types

Ground-static

In ground-static photography, photos of stationary aircraft are taken by photographers on the ground. Photos can be of aircraft exteriors, interiors, and aircraft details. The photographer has full control over lighting, aircraft placement, camera angles, and background. Involving other subjects such as the pilot or other aircraft is much easier to accomplish in ground-static photography than in other forms of aerial photography.
Aviation Gallery

Airport Terminal

Photography from an airport terminal is shooting through the terminal window, usually waiting for a flight. Some airports have windows or observation areas that you can visit without having to go through security. A polarized filter is recommended when shooting through glass to better control glare from the terminal. Images can turn out well or some can be contorted by the double glass when shooting on an angle.Aviation Gallery

Ground-to-air

In ground-to-air photography, photos of aircraft in flight are taken with the photographer on the ground. This type of photography is common at airshows or airports. Generally, a long focus photographic lens is necessary due to the greater distance between the photographer and the target aircraft. Along with ground-static photography, this is the most popular form of aviation photography.

Air-to-air

Air-to-air photography is the art of photographing aircraft in the air, while using another aircraft as a photo platform. The subject aircraft is photographed while both aircraft are in flight. This allows the photographer to position the subject in specific locations and angles to get the most desirable shot. Some things that must be considered to achieve best results are lighting and background. Proper lighting is achieved through correct placement of the aircraft relative to the sun, and is accomplished flying only at certain times of the day and/or by flying at a heading that lines the sun up on the subject aircraft properly. The background can highlight or distract from the subject and must be carefully considered when taking shots. Air-to-air photography uses include commercial use and advertising.
Aviation Gallery

Remote
Remote photography is a variation on aerial air-to-air photography, whereby the camera is mounted onto the external aircraft structure away from the photographer and is triggered remotely using a mechanical or electrical shutter release. The image has to be composed when the aircraft is on the ground, because the photographer has no access to the camera while the aircraft is in flight. Much brainstorming and planning must be done while setting up the camera to get the desired shot. Remote photography is the least common type of aviation photography.

The first time close head-on remote photography had been used was in 1977 when photographer Richard Cooke, working with Sqn Ldr Alan Voyle, Senior Engineering Officer of The Red Arrows, developed a camera bracket to fit on the underside of a spare Red Arrows Folland Gnat aircraft.  The pilots were carefully briefed on the ground and then, in the air, the photographer operated the camera from the back seat of the camera aircraft, using a mechanical release triggered by a solenoid, operated through the anti-collision light.

The Nikkormat camera with autowind pointed back at the Red Arrows team and was fitted with a wide angle 24mm Nikkor lens.  The photography was commissioned by the Telegraph Sunday Magazine and made the front cover on 3 July 1977.

Databases
Databases exist on the internet, cataloguing aviation photographs.  These include airliners.net, jetphotos.com, airplane-pictures.net, airhistory.net, v1images.com and allow users to search them for photographs of aircraft based on user-specified criteria.

Notable people 
 

 Rudy Arnold (1902–1966), aviation photographer

References

External links

Ridder Aero Media
Target Aviation Photography
Falcons Spotters - Aviation Photography
AirTeamImages Aviation Photo library
v1images Aviation Media - Stock Image Library
- Aviation Gallery
JetPhotos.net
AirHistory.net Aviation History Image Archive
AJ-Aviation Photography 
Mark Jayne Aviation Photography 
Aero Aviation Photography 
Photo Database
International Society for Aviation Photography
Black and White Aviation Photography
Aviation Photo Forum
Airplane-Pictures
Aircraft.co.za - User-submitted aviation photography site
OPShots.net Aviation Photo gallery

Photography
Aviation photographers
Aviation photography
Photography by genre
Aviation art